Old Loves and New is a 1926 American silent drama film directed by Maurice Tourneur in one of his final American films.

The romance and adventure story has the virtuous Lord Carew and the good-for-nothing Lord Geradine competing for the attentions of the virtuous Marny and the good-for-nothing Lady Carew, all set in the exotic desert sands of Algeria. The setting and story are completely typical of the desert-romance genre novelist Edith Maude Hull invented and specialized in. This film is now lost.

Cast

References

External links

Turner Classic Movies page
Still with Barbara Bedford at gettyimages.com

1926 films
American silent feature films
American black-and-white films
Films directed by Maurice Tourneur
First National Pictures films
1926 romantic drama films
1926 adventure films
Lost American films
Films based on works by E. M. Hull
American adventure films
American romantic drama films
1920s American films
Silent romantic drama films
Silent adventure films
Silent American drama films